The Corda Formation is a red sandstone geologic formation in the Parnaíba Basin in Tocantins, Brazil. It was formed during the Neoaptian to Eoalbian series of the Early Cretaceous.

Large-scale fossil sauropod tracks have been reported from the formation.

Origin 
The Corda Formation is characterized by reddish sandstones, that were probably deposited in windy deserts and fast flowing freshwater streams. Therefore, fossils are very rare.

Occurrence 
This formation outcrops in the central part of the Parnaíba Basin, between the mouth of the Araguaia River in the west the Parnaíba River in the east.

Lithology 
The Corda Formation consists largely of red sandstone, with very fine to medium grain size, rich in zeolites and iron oxide. Where whinstones are overlaying fragments of this rock are also present. Typical structures of wind dunes (cross bedding, ripples, and grain flow) are common. This is consistent with deposition in a desert system.

See also 
 List of dinosaur-bearing rock formations
 Sauropod tracks
 Romualdo Formation, contemporaneous fossiliferous formation of the Araripe Basin
 Itapecuru Formation, contemporaneous fossiliferous formation of the São Luis and Parnaíba Basins

References

Bibliography 
 
 
  

Geologic formations of Brazil
Lower Cretaceous Series of South America
Cretaceous Brazil
Albian Stage
Aptian Stage
Sandstone formations
Fluvial deposits
Ichnofossiliferous formations
Fossiliferous stratigraphic units of South America
Paleontology in Brazil
Formations